Sulfur chloride pentafluoride is an inorganic compound with the formula . It exists as a colorless gas at room temperature and is highly toxic, like most inorganic compounds containing the pentafluorosulfide (–) functional group. The compound adopts an octahedral geometry with  symmetry. Sulfur chloride pentafluoride is the only commercially available reagent for adding the – group to organic compounds.

Reactivity
 is highly reactive and toxic. In contrast, sulfur hexafluoride is inert and nontoxic despite having a closely related chemical formula.

Under free-radical conditions,  adds across double bonds. The following reaction occurs with propene:
 +  → CH3CHClCH2SF5

 is also a precursor to O(SF5)2 and F2NSF5 (from tetrafluorohydrazine).

Synthesis
Sulfur chloropentafluoride can be synthesized by several routes, starting from two lower sulfur fluorides, sulfur tetrafluoride and disulfur decafluoride:
 +  +  →  + 
 +  → 
 +  → 2 

The corresponding  is prepared similarly from in-situ generated bromine monofluoride.

References

Sulfur chlorides
Sulfur fluorides